Bokar or Bokar-Ramo is a Tani language spoken by the Lhoba in West Siang district, Arunachal Pradesh, India (Megu 1990) and Nanyi Township 南伊珞巴民族乡, Mainling County, Tibet Autonomous Region, China (Ouyang 1985).

The Ramo dialect is spoken in Mechukha Subdivision and Monigong Circle (Badu 2004).

Phonology

Consonants 

 The pronunciation of /ɕ/ may vary between [ɕ] and [s] among different dialects.
 Some speakers may also pronounce /tɕ/ as [ts] when preceding vowels other than /i/.
 /h/ can be realized as either voiced [ɦ] or [h], when preceding /i/.
Stops /p t k/ are heard as unreleased [p̚ t̚ k̚] in word-coda position.
 A retroflex affricate /tʂ/ can also occur only from Tibetan loanwords.

Vowels 

 /ɯ/ can also be heard as more central [ɨ].
 /o/ is heard as more open and nasalized before /ŋ/ as [ɔ̃ŋ].

Writing system
Bokar is written in the Latin script in India and the Tibetan script in China.

References

Badu, Tapoli. 2004. Ramo language guide. Itanagar: Directorate of Research, Government of Arunachal Pradesh.
Ouyang, Jueya. 1985. Luobazu Yuyan Jianzhi (Bengni-Boga'eryu) [Brief Description of the Luoba Nationality Language (The Bengni-Bokar Language)]. Beijing: Minzu Chubanshe.

Tani languages
Languages of Assam
Languages of China
Languages of Tibet